The 2003 Halifax RLFC season was the 108th season in the club's rugby league history and the eighth season in the Super League. Coached by Tony Anderson, Halifax competed in Super League VIII and finished in 12th place, relegating the club to National League One. The club also reached the fourth round of the Challenge Cup.

Table

Squad

2003 fixtures and results

2003 Super League Results

References

External links
Halifax RLFC - Rugby League Project

Halifax
Halifax R.L.F.C.